Petr Čtvrtníček (born 5 April 1964 in Prague) is a Czech actor and comedian.

Selected filmography
 Kouř (1991)
 Fany (1995)
 Tomík (1997)
 Česká soda (1998)
 Mazaný Filip (2003)
 Ivánku, kamaráde, můžeš mluvit? aneb Tak to mi ho teda vyndej (2005)
 Obsluhoval jsem anglického krále (2006)
 František je děvkař (2008)
 Anděl Páně 2 (2016)
 Pohádky pro Emu (2016)

TV series 
 Česká soda (1993)
 Gynekologie 2 (2007)
 Alles Gute (2009)
 Autobazar Monte Karlo (2015)
 Přístav (2015)
 Krejzovi (2018)

Voice 
 Kuky se vrací (2010)
 Lajka (2017)

References

External links
 

 
1964 births
Living people
Czech male film actors
Czech male stage actors
Czech male television actors
20th-century Czech male actors
21st-century Czech male actors
Male actors from Prague